Srinath Raghavan is an Indian historian of contemporary history. He is a professor of history and international relations at Ashoka University and a senior fellow at the Carnegie Endowment for International Peace. He is also a visiting senior research fellow at the India Institute of the King's College London and previously, was a senior fellow at the Centre for Policy Research, specialising in contemporary and historical aspects of India’s foreign and security policies.

Raghavan has authored and edited multiple books, which have been subject to critical acclaim. about India's strategic history, and has been a regular commentator on foreign and strategic affairs. He is a recipient of the K. Subrahmanyam Award for Strategic Studies (2011) and the Infosys Prize for Social Sciences (2015).

Life 
Srinath Raghavan was born in 1977. He studied in Hyderabad, Kolkata and Chennai, graduating with a bachelor's degree in physics from the University of Madras in 1997.

Raghavan joined the Indian Army in 1997 as a commissioned officer in the infantry. He worked for six years in the Rajputana Rifles, serving in Sikkim, Rajasthan and Jammu and Kashmir. He termed his "short service" in the Army as an "extended break", during which he figured out his future direction.

He entered the academia in 2003, studying at King's College London on an Inlaks scholarship. He worked with Lawrence Freedman, Professor of War Studies at King's College, receiving an MA and PhD in War Studies. His Ph.D. dissertation was the basis of his first book, War and Peace in Modern India.

Afterwards, Raghavan worked as a lecturer in Defence studies at King's College, teaching there for three years. He currently works at the Carnegie India, a policy think tank in New Delhi.

Raghavan is a prolific writer, having published three works on the strategic history of India between 2010–2016. He is working on three further books.
In 2015, Raghavan was chosen by India's Ministry of Defence to head a team of historians working on the official history of the Kargil War. The project was to last two years. He has served as a member of the National Security Advisory Board formed by the Indian Prime Minister.

Books

War and Peace in Modern India: A Strategic History of the Nehru Years 
His first book, it covered the strategic history of Jawaharlal Nehru's premiership and was published as part of The Indian Century Series edited by scholars Ramachandra Guha and Sunil Khilnani. The editors stated in the book's preface that Raghavan has set a "benchmark" for the historical study of the strategic and foreign policy issues of India. He has covered the strategic crises faced by India in the first fifteen years of its independent existence, using a range of sources and analytical depth.

Scholar Kristina Roepstorff, in a book review, agreed that the book successfully illuminates the rationale behind the strategic choices made by Nehru in facing the major dilemmas during his tenure. It offers a "brilliant account" of the events that shaped Nehru's strategic thinking and his approach to crisis management. She assessed the book's original findings are highly relevant to the ongoing crises in the subcontinent. However, while the book contained excellent historical account, she found it to be short on "theoretical reflection". She also noted that the book covered a selection of case studies, mainly dealing with India's princely states and crises with neighbours but omitted the international dimensions further out, such as the crises dealing with Goa or Congo. She felt that further justification of the selection of cases was necessary to avert selection bias in drawing general conclusions.

Shashank Joshi called the book a "commanding diplomatic history" of the Nehru years. Odd Arne Westad called it "international history at its very best". Scholar Jivanta Schottli called it "polished historical study", and Rudra Chaudhuri said it should be considered "the single most important text on Indian strategic history". Priya Chacko noted that it is meticulously researched and draws on previously untapped archival sources, such as the private papers of British officials, allowing Raghavan to circumvent the usual limitations of diplomatic history.

Historian Perry Anderson finds that Srinath Raghavan is a firm apologist for India and describes his book as a hymn to Nehru's strategism.

1971: A Global History of the Creation of Bangladesh 
The book has been subject to positive reception, among critics.

India's War: The Making of Modern South Asia, 1939-1945 
The book has been subject to positive reception, among critics.

The Most Dangerous Place: A History of the United States in South Asia 
The book has been subject to positive reception, among critics.

References

Living people
21st-century Indian historians
21st-century Indian non-fiction writers
Indian political writers
Indian editors
21st-century Indian educators
1977 births